Will Johnson may refer to:

Will Johnson (composer), American composer and improvisor
Will Johnson (defensive lineman) (born 1964), American-born American and Canadian football defensive lineman
Will Johnson (musician) (born 1971), leader of Texas indie rock band Centro-matic
Will Johnson (rugby union, born 1974), English rugby union player
Will Johnson (rugby union, born 1984), American rugby union player
Will Johnson (soccer) (born 1987), Canadian soccer player
Will Johnson (fullback) (born 1988), American football fullback
Will Johnson (Australian footballer) (born 1989), Australian rules footballer
Will Johnson (cornerback) (born 2003), American football cornerback

See also
Wil Johnson (born 1965), English actor
Bill Johnson (disambiguation)
Billy Johnson (disambiguation)
William Johnson (disambiguation)
Willie Johnson (disambiguation)